Jhutha Sach  is a 1984 Bollywood drama film directed by Esmayeel Shroff and produced by A. G. Nadiadwala. It starring Dharmendra and Rekha. The film was remade in Telugu as Kodetrachu. It was the second movie for child actor Jugal Hansraj, after Masoom.

Cast 
Dharmendra as Vijay / Tiger (Double Role)
 Rekha as Alka
 Aruna Irani as Bahar
 Amrish Puri as Kolga
 Jugal Hansraj as Bhishan "Binny"
 Asrani as Bhajanlal
 Prema Narayan as Mrs. Bhajanlal
 Lalita Pawar as Governess

Soundtrack 
Lyrics: Majrooh Sultanpuri

References

External links 
 

1984 films
1980s Hindi-language films
Hindi films remade in other languages
Films scored by R. D. Burman
Indian drama films